The Carpathian National Nature Park is a National Park located in Ivano-Frankivsk Oblast, Ukraine. The park was established on 3 June 1980 to protect landscapes of the Carpathian Mountains. The headquarters of the park are in Yaremche. Carpathian National Nature Park is the first national park of Ukraine and one of the biggest national parks of the country.

Topography
The area of the park is shared between Nadvirna Raion and Verkhovyna Raion in the southwest of Ivano-Frankivsk Oblast, at the border with Zakarpattia Oblast. The park is located in the highest part of the Ukrainian Carpathians, on the eastern slopes in the drainage basins of the Prut River and the Black Cheremosh River. The Prut has its source in the park, and the highest point of Ukraine, Mount Hoverla, is located at the borders of the park.

In 1968, it was merged into the newly created Carpathian State Reserve. Carpathian National Nature Park was established in 1980 by the decree of the Council of Ministers of Ukrainian Soviet Socialist Republic, and included about a half of the area which previously belonged to the Carpathian State Reserve. The park is an independent unit subordinated to the Ministry of Ecology and Natural Resources of Ukraine.

Ecoregion and climate
The park is in the Carpathian montane forests ecoregion.  Because of its altitude, the climate of the Carpathian Park is Subarctic climate, without dry season (Köppen climate classification Subarctic climate (Dfc)). This climate is characterized by mild summers (only 1–3 months above ) and cold, snowy winters (coldest month below ).

Flora and fauna

The landscapes in the park include Alpine meadows and forests. The three most common tree species in the park are silver fir, European beech, and spruce. The Huk Waterfall, located within the park, is the highest single-drop waterfall in the Ukrainian Carpathians. There are two lakes of glacial origin.

Public use
The area of the Carpathian National Nature Park was historically inhabited by hutsuls and contains a number of monuments of history and architecture, including historical wooden buildings. It is actively used for tourism, with 48 maintained trails (as of 2012).

See also
 Biały Słoń

References

External links

1980 establishments in Ukraine
Geography of Ivano-Frankivsk Oblast
National parks of Ukraine
Protected areas established in 1980
Verkhovyna Raion